Parasiphula is a genus of crustose lichens in the family Coccotremataceae. The genus was circumscribed by Gintaras Kantvilas and Martin Grube in 2006, and contains seven species that are known from cool to cold latitudes in the Southern Hemisphere.

Species
Parasiphula comata 
Parasiphula complanata 
Parasiphula elixii 
Parasiphula foliacea 
Parasiphula fragilis 
Parasiphula georginae 
Parasiphula jamesii

References

Pertusariales
Pertusariales genera
Lichen genera
Taxa described in 2006
Taxa named by Gintaras Kantvilas